Chuquiña is a small town in Bolivia. In 2009 it had an estimated population of 1048.

References

Populated places in Oruro Department